Muranah (also spelled Murrany) is a village in northern Syria located northwest of Homs in the Homs Governorate. According to the Syria Central Bureau of Statistics, Muranah had a population of 395 in the 2004 census. Its inhabitants are predominantly Alawites, Greek Orthodox Christians and Maronites.

References

Bibliography

 

Populated places in Homs District
Alawite communities in Syria
Eastern Orthodox Christian communities in Syria
Maronite communities